Aphelocephala is a genus of bird in the thornbill family Acanthizidae. The three species are collectively known as whitefaces. They are endemic to Australia, generally occurring in the arid centre of the continent. They are a striking looking bird, particularly compared to their duller looking relatives, having dark upperparts and white breasts and faces (as suggested by the name). Two species, the chestnut-breasted and banded whitefaces, break up the white undersides with a darker band (or double band). The three species have stubby bills and unlike the rest of the Acanthizidae they consume large numbers of seeds in their diet.

The genus had been originally described as Xerophila by John Gould, however Harry Church Oberholser pointed out that this genus name had been given to a genus of mollusc. Hence he proposed the name Aphelocephala from the Ancient Greek aphelos "simple" and kephale (Latin:caput) "head".

It contains the following species:
 Southern whiteface (Aphelocephala leucopsis)
 Chestnut-breasted whiteface (Aphelocephala pectoralis)
 Banded whiteface (Aphelocephala nigricincta)

References

 del Hoyo, J.; Elliot, A. & Christie D. (editors). (2006). Handbook of the Birds of the World. Volume 12: Picathartes to Tits and Chickadees. Lynx Edicions. 

 
Bird genera
Taxa named by Harry C. Oberholser
Taxonomy articles created by Polbot